Zinedine Ferhat (born 1 March 1993) is an Algerian professional footballer who plays as a midfielder for Süper Lig club Alanyaspor and the Algeria national team.

Club career

USM Alger
On 19 November 2011, with the new coach Didier Ollé-Nicolle Ferhat made his professional debut for USM Alger in a league game against JS Kabylie where he participated in 90 minutes. Then he participated in 19 games between the Ligue 1 and the cup, including six games in 90 minutes and is a good outcome for his 18 years coming of the Academy of FAF, The following season he became Farhat, a key player in the team where he participated in 30 Match and scored two first goals was against CA Bordj Bou Arreridj on 2 February 2013, with the end of the season made Ferhat first two titles in his career the Algerian Cup and the UAFA Club Cup also received the best young player award at the League.

In the 2013–14 season Ferhat began to receive special offers from France of professionalism especially from Montpellier and former coach Rolland Courbis. where he presented a fabulous season contributed to the victory of USM Alger league title after nine years and also won the Super Cup at the end of the season participated Ferhat in 31 Match scored five goals and provided eight assists. The following season Ferhat was injured several times kept him out of several matches which reflected negatively on the team where he survived a fall in the last round after the piece and in the last season with the team Ferhat contributed to the arrival of USM Alger CAF Champions League Final for the first time, but were defeated against TP Mazembe, but with the end of the season won the last title with USM Alger, a title for the second time in its history, and with 10 assists.

Le Havre
On 13 June 2016, Ferhat signed for three years with French Ligue 2 club Le Havre. He made his debut on 29 July against Orléans playing 90 minutes. He scored his first goal on 3 February 2017 against Red Star.

Ferhat finished the 2017–18 Ligue 2 season as the top assister, setting a record with 20 assists in the season.

Nîmes
Ferhat joined Ligue 1 club Nîmes on 3 July 2019 as a free transfer following the expiry of his contract with Le Havre.

Alanyaspor 

On 22 July 2022, Ferhat signed for Süper Lig club Alanyaspor on a two-year contract. He was given the number 10 shirt.

International career
On 24 March 2010, Ferhat was called up for the first time to the Algeria under-20 national team for the 2010 UNAF U-20 Tournament. On 26 March 2012, Ferhat was called up for the 2012 UNAF U-20 Tournament that was held in Algeria. He scored a penalty in the 27th minute against Morocco in the play-off for third place.

Ferhat was a member of the Algeria under-20 national team at the 2013 African U-20 Championship. Despite Algeria failing to progress past the group stage, Ferhat's performances earned him a place in the team of the tournament.

In November 2015, Ferhat was a member of the Algeria under-23 national team at the 2015 U-23 Africa Cup of Nations in Senegal.

Career statistics

Club

Honours
USM Alger
 Algerian Ligue Professionnelle 1: 2013–14, 2015–16
 Algerian Cup: 2013
 Algerian Super Cup: 2013
 UAFA Club Cup: 2013

Algeria U23
Africa U-23 Cup of Nations runner-up: 2015

References

External links

1993 births
Living people
People from Bordj Menaïel
People from Bordj Menaïel District
People from Boumerdès Province
Kabyle people
Algerian footballers
Association football midfielders
Algeria international footballers
Algeria A' international footballers
Algeria youth international footballers
2013 African U-20 Championship players
2015 Africa U-23 Cup of Nations players
Algerian Ligue Professionnelle 1 players
Ligue 1 players
Ligue 2 players
Süper Lig players
JS Kabylie players
USM Alger players
Le Havre AC players
Nîmes Olympique players
Alanyaspor footballers
Algerian expatriate footballers
Algerian expatriate sportspeople in France
Expatriate footballers in France
Algerian expatriate sportspeople in Turkey
Expatriate footballers in Turkey
21st-century Algerian people